Large subunit GTPase 1 homolog is an enzyme that in humans is encoded by the LSG1 gene.

References

Further reading